The 2011 Australian Swimming Championships were held from 1 April until 8 April 2011 at the Sydney International Aquatic Centre in Sydney, New South Wales. They doubled up as the national trials for the 2011 World Aquatics Championships.

Qualification criteria

Medallists

Men's events

Women's events

References
 Championships results
 World championships qualifying criteria

Australian championships
Australian Swimming Championships
Sports competitions in Sydney
2010s in Sydney
April 2011 sports events in Australia